Anvik is a city, home to the Deg Hit'an people, in the Yukon-Koyukuk Census Area, Alaska, United States. The name Anvik, meaning "exit" in the Central Alaskan Yup'ik language, became the common usage despite multiple names at the time, and may have come from early Russian explorers. The native name in the Deg Xinag language is Deloy Ges.  The population was 85 at the 2010 census, down from 104 in 2000.

Geography
Anvik is located west of the Yukon River at the mouth of the Anvik River. There is a public Anvik Airport (ANV) with a 2,960-foot (902 m) gravel runway located one mile (1.6 km) southeast of downtown Anvik.

The Anvik Connector is a trail, designated a national side trail, which links the community to the Iditarod Trail  to the east.

It is an incorporated place (FIPS 55-3 Class C6).

Demographics

Anvik first appeared on the 1880 U.S. Census as Anvik Station and Village with 95 residents: 94 were members of the Tinneh tribe and 1 was White. It has returned as Anvik since 1890 (however, for the purpose of consolidation, Anvik's total population that year included both the Anvik Mission and Station, as well as the native (Tinneh) village and Kaltag). It incorporated in 1969.

At the 2000 census, there were 104 people, 39 households and 23 families residing in the city. There were 49 housing units at an average density of 5.2 per square mile (2.0/km2). The racial makeup of the city was 94 Native American, nine White, and one from other races. One also reported Hispanic or Latino ethnicity.

Of the 39 households, 41.0% had children under the age of 18 living with them, 30.8% were married couples living together, 25.6% had a female householder with no husband present, and 41.0% were non-families. 33.3% of all households were made up of individuals, and 7.7% had someone living alone who was 65 years of age or older. The average household size was 2.67 and the average family size was 3.43.

Age distribution was 34 under the age of 15, 6 from 16 to 18, 9 from 18 to 24, 28 from 25 to 44, 19 from 45 to 64, and 8 who were 65 years of age or older. The average age was 30.14 and the median age was 28.5 years, compared to 32.4 for the entire state. There were 57 males (35 over 18) and 47 females (29 over 18).

The annual median household income was $21,250, and the median family income was $18,125. Males had a median income of $0 versus $18,750 for females. The per capita income for the city was $8,081 (compare $21,587 nationally). Median rent was $263 and monthly housing and mortgage costs were $833. There were 40.0% of families and 44.2% of the population living below the poverty line, including 45.5% of under eighteens and 50.0% of those over 64.

Education
The Iditarod Area School District operates the Blackwell School in Anvik.

References

Further reading

External links

 Anvik at the Community Database Online from the Alaska Division of Community and Regional Affairs
 Maps from the Alaska Department of Labor and Workforce Development: 2000, 2010
 Anvik Tribal Council
 Anvik Historical Society
 Blackwell School in Anvik
 
 
 

Cities in Alaska
Cities in Yukon–Koyukuk Census Area, Alaska
Deg Xitʼan
Road-inaccessible communities of Alaska
Yukon River